In molecular biology mir-320 microRNA is a short RNA molecule. MicroRNAs function to regulate the expression levels of other genes by several mechanisms.

The biogenesis of miR-320 is different from the canonical Microprocessor-dependent miRNAs. The pre-miR-320 is transcribed directly as a precursor microRNA hairpin and thus contains a 5′ m7G-cap.

See also 
 MicroRNA

References

External links
 

MicroRNA
Non-coding RNA